ZZ-type zinc finger-containing protein 3 is a protein that in humans is encoded by the ZZZ3 gene.

Model organisms				

Model organisms have been used in the study of ZZZ3 function. A conditional knockout mouse line, called Zzz3tm1a(EUCOMM)Wtsi was generated as part of the International Knockout Mouse Consortium program — a high-throughput mutagenesis project to generate and distribute animal models of disease to interested scientists.

Male and female animals underwent a standardized phenotypic screen to determine the effects of deletion. Twenty four tests were carried out on mutant mice and two significant abnormalities were observed.  No homozygous mutant embryos were identified during gestation, and therefore none survived until weaning. The remaining tests were carried out on heterozygous mutant adult mice and no further abnormal phenotypes were identified.

See also
ZZ zinc finger

References

Further reading 
 
 
 

Genes mutated in mice